Norman Bullock (1932 – 2003) was an English footballer, who played as a winger in the Football League for Chester.

References

1932 births
2003 deaths
Sportspeople from Nuneaton
Association football wingers
English footballers
Nuneaton Borough F.C. players
Aston Villa F.C. players
Chester City F.C. players
Rhyl F.C. players
English Football League players